The 1986 Deutsche Tourenwagen Meisterschaft was the third season of premier German touring car championship and also first season under the moniker of Deutsche Tourenwagen Meisterschaft.

The championship was run under modified Group A regulations, which was won by Kurt Thiim driving a Rover Vitesse.

Schedule and results

Championship standings

Scoring system
Points were awarded to the top eighteen classified finishers. Only the best eight round results were retained.

Drivers' Standings

References

Deutsche Tourenwagen Masters seasons
1986 in German motorsport
1986 in West German motorsport